Pseudombrophila is a genus of fungi in the family Pyronemataceae.  The widely distributed genus contains 28 species.

Species
Pseudombrophila aggregata
Pseudombrophila cervaria
Pseudombrophila deerrata
Pseudombrophila equina
Pseudombrophila hepatica
Pseudombrophila leporum
Pseudombrophila merdaria
Pseudombrophila misturae
Pseudombrophila pedrottii
Pseudombrophila pluvialis
Pseudombrophila porcina
Pseudombrophila ramosa
Pseudombrophila theioleuca

References

External links

Pyronemataceae
Pezizales genera